Several special routes exist for U.S. Route 51.

Ponchatoula–Hammond business route

Dyersburg business route

South Fulton–Fulton bypass route

U.S. Route 51 Bypass (US 51 Byp.) was a bypass of the downtown areas of South Fulton, Tennessee and Fulton, Kentucky. It was commissioned in 1970. In 1989, mainline US 51 and US 45 were moved to the bypass, and the bypass designation was decommissioned.

Decatur business route

U.S. Route 51 Business (US 51 Bus.) was a business loop that ran through downtown Decatur, Illinois. It was commissioned in 1978, after a freeway bypass of Decatur was completed. In 1995, a freeway bypass of Elwin was completed, and US 51 Bus. was subsequently extended. In 2011, the route was decommissioned in an effort to reduce the amount of heavy truck traffic through downtown Decatur.

Major intersections

Clinton business route

U.S. Route 51 Business (US 51 Bus.) is a business loop that runs through downtown Clinton, Illinois. It was commissioned in 1983, after an expressway bypass of Clinton was completed.

Major intersections

Bloomington–Normal business route

Beloit spur route

Spur U.S. Highway 51 (Spur US 51) is an unsigned spur route, connecting US 51 with WIS 213 via Broad Street in downtown Beloit, Wisconsin.

Plover–Stevens Point business route

Business U.S. Highway 51 (Bus. US 51) was a business loop that ran through the communities of Plover, Whiting, and Stevens Point. The route was commissioned after a freeway bypass of the Stevens Point area was completed in 1971. Around 2009, the route through Stevens Point was removed from the Wisconsin State Trunk Highway System and became a city street, though the highway remained signed. In 2019, the American Association of State Highway and Transportation Officials approved eliminating Bus. US 51 as the remainder of the route was planned to be transferred to the villages of Plover and Whiting in 2020.

Major intersections

Rothschild–Wausau business route

Business U.S. Highway 51 (Bus. US 51) is a business loop serving the communities of Rothschild, Schofield, and Wausau, Wisconsin. It was commissioned in 1963, when an expressway bypass of the Wausau area was finished.

Merrill business route

Business U.S. Highway 51 (Bus. US 51) was a business loop that served Merrill, Wisconsin. The business loop was established in 1976 after a freeway bypass was completed east of Merrill. In 1998, without any significant changes during its existence, it was then decommissioned in favor of CTH-K and CTH-Q.

References

51
U.S. Route 51